USS Radford (DD-446), named for Rear Admiral William Radford, was a  in the United States Navy. Entering service in 1942 during World War II the ship also saw action during the Korean War and the Vietnam War. The ship was removed from service in 1969 and sold for scrap in 1970.

Construction and career

Radford was laid down by the Federal Shipbuilding and Drydock Company at Kearny, New Jersey on 2 October 1941 and was launched on 3 May 1942 by Radford's granddaughter Edith (Mrs. François E. Matthes). The destroyer was commissioned on 22 July 1942.

Radford participated in the Battle of Kula Gulf and the Battle of Kolombangara in July 1943. She engaged in an offensive sweep against the Tokyo Express, and received Presidential Unit Citation for the rescue of 468 survivors from the cruiser , which had been sunk at Kula Gulf. The destroyer was damaged by a Japanese mine while supporting the liberation of Luzon in December 1944 and received a Presidential Unit Citation from the Philippine government. The ship was decommissioned on 17 January 1946 and placed in reserve at San Francisco.

Radford was recommissioned on 17 October 1949, and operated with the United States Seventh Fleet in support of United Nations Forces during the Korean War. Following the armistice in 1953, she alternated operations along the west coast and in Hawaiian waters with annual deployments to the western Pacific with the Seventh Fleet. In 1960, Radford underwent an extensive Fleet Rehabilitation and Modernization (FRAM II) overhaul at the Pearl Harbor Navy Yard.

On 3 March 1965, Radford, in company with other units of Destroyer Division 252, departed Pearl Harbor on short notice to augment destroyer forces for the rapidly expanding naval commitments in the South China Sea. In October and December Radford served as an alternate recovery ship in Project Gemini and participated in Sea Dragon and Market Time operations, patrolled on search and rescue duties and carried out naval gunfire support (NGFS) missions during the Vietnam War from 1965 through 1969.

Her eleventh WestPac tour began on 5 July 1966. During this period, she participated in anti-submarine operations, escorted aircraft carriers in the Gulf of Tonkin, had two tours of duty on NGFS missions, a turn on the Taiwan patrol, served as forward picket for the Seventh Fleet units operating in the South China Sea and escorted President Lyndon B. Johnson's support units to Malaysia during his tour of southeast Asia. DesDiv 252 returned to Pearl Harbor on 16 December 1966.

Radford was decommissioned at San Francisco just months after returning from her 1969 WestPac tour. She was stricken from the Naval Vessel Register on 10 November 1969, and sold for scrap in October 1970, but not before she fought one last battle on her own.

Awards
Radford received twelve battle stars and two Presidential Unit Citations for World War II service, five battle stars for the Korean War, four for the Vietnam War, and the Armed Forces Expeditionary Medal.

USS Radford National Naval Museum

The USS Radford National Naval Museum was a collection of memorabilia about the ship that was located in Newcomerstown, Ohio. The museum closed in 2011 and its contents were moved to the USS Orleck Naval Museum that is located in Lake Charles, Louisiana. Exhibits include photos, uniforms, and displays about the ship and her service.

References

External links
USS Radford website at Destroyer History Foundation
USS Radford National Naval Museum
       navsource.org: USS Radford
 hazegray.org: USS Radford

 

World War II destroyers of the United States
Cold War destroyers of the United States
Korean War destroyers of the United States
Vietnam War destroyers of the United States
Ships built in Kearny, New Jersey
Defunct museums in Ohio
1942 ships
Fletcher-class destroyers of the United States Navy
Museum ships in Ohio